Quintino Antônio Ferreira de Sousa Bocaiuva (4 December 1836 – 11 July 1912) was a Brazilian politician and writer. He served as Minister of Foreign Affairs of Brazil, between 1889 and 1891, and was also President of the State of Rio de Janeiro, between 1900 and 1903. He was known for his actions during the Proclamation of the Republic.

Bocaiuva was born in Itaguaí and then moved to São Paulo, where he started working as typographer. He started to study Law but dropped off the studies due economical reasons. As a Nativist, he adopted the name "Bocaiuva" in reference to a local kind of palm tree. He started as a journalist defending Republican ideas in some newspapers of Rio de Janeiro.

He died in Rio de Janeiro at 75. The neighborhood where he lived in the city was named after him, Quintino Bocaiuva, and is popularly known as Quintino.

References

External links

1836 births
1912 deaths
Brazilian male writers
Governors of Rio de Janeiro (state)
Brazilian diplomats
Foreign ministers of Brazil
People from Itaguaí